Risk is the possibility of loss or injury.

Risk, Risks, or The Risk may also refer to:

Arts, entertainment, and media

Films
 Risk (2001 film), an Australian film
 Risk (2007 film), a Bollywood film directed by Vishram Sawant
 Risk (2016 film), an American documentary

Games
 Risk (game), a strategy board game of world conquest
 Risk (video game), a 1988 game based on the board game
 Risk (1996 video game), the Windows version

Literature
 "Risk" (short story), a 1955 science fiction short story by Isaac Asimov
 Risk, a book by John Adams

Music
 Risk (band), German thrash metal band

Albums
 Risk (Megadeth album), a 1999 album by the metal band Megadeth
 Risk (Terminaator album), a 2001 album by rock band Terminaator
 Risk (Ten Shekel Shirt album), 2003
 Risk (Paul Brandt album), a 2007 album by country music singer Paul Brandt

Songs
 "Risk", a song by Deftones from the 2010 album Diamond Eyes
 "Risk", a song by Die Krupps from 1985 album Entering the Arena
 "Risk", a song by Metric from the 2018 album Art of Doubt

Periodicals
 Risk (magazine), a financial magazine covering risk management
 RISKS Digest, an online computer periodical

Other uses in arts, entertainment, and media
 Risk (character), a DC comics character and member of the Teen Titans
 "Risk" (Person of Interest), a television episode
 RISK!, a storytelling podcast created and hosted by Kevin Allison
 The Risk (group), a musical group in The X Factor (British series 8)

Math and science
 Statistical risk

People
 Charles Risk (1897–1943), American politician
 Charles Risk (footballer), Scottish footballer
 Ralph Risk (1891–1961), Scottish lawyer and footballer
 RISK (graffiti artist), Los Angeles-based graffiti artist and fashion entrepreneur

Other uses
 The Risk, New South Wales, a rural locality in New South Wales
 Risk, County Londonderry, a townland in Northern Ireland
 RiSK, a television production company co-founded by Karl Pilkington
 Risk, the collective noun for lobsters

See also
 Risky (disambiguation)
 RISC (disambiguation)